Kenneth Keller Hall (February 24, 1918 – July 8, 1999) was a United States circuit judge of the United States Court of Appeals for the Fourth Circuit and was previously a United States district judge of the United States District Court for the Southern District of West Virginia.

Education and career
Born in Greenview, West Virginia. He graduated from Scott High School, where he was the captain of the football team. He attended New River State College and Morris Harvey College. He moved to Washington, D.C. and worked a government employee in civil service. He served in the United States Naval Reserve during the World War II era, from 1942 to 1945 and was discharged as a lieutenant. He received a Juris Doctor from West Virginia University College of Law in 1948, and was in private practice in Madison, West Virginia from 1948 to 1953, also serving as Mayor of Madison from 1949 to 1952. He was a judge of the West Virginia 25th Judicial Circuit in Madison from 1953 to 1969, returning to private practice there from 1969 to 1970. He was a Hearing Examiner for the Bureau of Hearings and Appeals of the Social Security Administration in Charleston, West Virginia from 1970 to 1971.

Federal judicial service
Hall was nominated by President Richard Nixon on November 22, 1971, to a seat on the United States District Court for the Southern District of West Virginia vacated by Judge John A. Field Jr. He was confirmed by the United States Senate on December 1, 1971, and received his commission on December 6, 1971. His service was terminated on September 26, 1976, due to elevation to the Fourth Circuit.

Hall was nominated by President Gerald Ford on August 26, 1976, to a seat on the United States Court of Appeals for the Fourth Circuit vacated by Judge John A. Field Jr. He was confirmed by the Senate on September 1, 1976, and received his commission on September 3, 1976. He assumed senior status on February 24, 1998. His service was terminated on July 8, 1999, due to his death in Charleston.

References

Sources
 

1918 births
1999 deaths
People from Madison, West Virginia
West Virginia circuit court judges
Judges of the United States District Court for the Southern District of West Virginia
United States district court judges appointed by Richard Nixon
20th-century American judges
Judges of the United States Court of Appeals for the Fourth Circuit
United States court of appeals judges appointed by Gerald Ford
United States Navy officers
West Virginia University alumni
20th-century American lawyers
Mayors of places in West Virginia
Morris Harvey College alumni
United States Navy reservists
West Virginia University Institute of Technology alumni
United States Navy personnel of World War II